3x3 basketball at the 2009 Asian Youth Games was contested by 19 teams in the boys' tournament and 16 teams in the girls' tournament. All games were held at Anglican High School, Singapore. The competition was held using the FIBA 33 ruleset developed by the sport's worldwide governing body, FIBA.

Medalists

Medal table

Results

Boys

Preliminary round

Group A

Group B

Group C

Group D

Knockout round

Quarterfinals

Semifinals

3rd & 4th place

Final

Girls

Preliminary round

Group A

Group B

Group C

Group D

 Uzbekistan lost the match by default against Philippines as all but 1 of its players were fouled out. As Uzbekistan were ahead 28–26 when the game was called off.

Knockout round

Quarterfinals

Semifinals

3rd & 4th place

Final

References

 Official site
 FIBA 33 Rules

Basketball at the Asian Youth Games
2009 in 3x3 basketball
basketball
2009–10 in Asian basketball
2009–10 in Singaporean basketball
International basketball competitions hosted by Singapore